Gilmar de Lima Nascimento, known as Gilmar Fubá or Gilmar (13 August 1975 – 15 March 2021) was a Brazilian professional footballer who played as a midfielder.

Career
Born in São Paulo, Gilmar Fubá began his career with Corinthians. He later played for Fluminense, Rio Branco, Portuguesa Santista, FC Schalke 04, Ulsan Hyundai, Criciúma, Al Ahli, Noroeste and Red Bull Brasil. In February 2011 he was one of five players sacked by Santa Helena.

He died on 15 March 2021, aged 45, having been suffering from bone marrow cancer.

References

1975 births
2021 deaths
Brazilian footballers
Sport Club Corinthians Paulista players
Fluminense FC players
Associação Atlética Portuguesa (Santos) players
FC Schalke 04 players
Ulsan Hyundai FC players
Criciúma Esporte Clube players
Al Ahli SC (Doha) players
Esporte Clube Noroeste players
Red Bull Brasil players
Santa Helena Esporte Clube players
Association football midfielders
Brazilian expatriate footballers
Brazilian expatriate sportspeople in Germany
Expatriate footballers in Germany
Brazilian expatriate sportspeople in South Korea
Expatriate footballers in South Korea
Brazilian expatriate sportspeople in Qatar
Expatriate footballers in Qatar
Footballers from São Paulo